Admiral Sir Stanley Cecil James Colville,  (21 February 1861 – 9 April 1939) was a senior Royal Navy officer.

Naval career
Colville was born in Eaton Place, London, the second son of Charles Colville, 10th Lord Colville of Culross, entitling him to the style "The Honourable". His mother, Cecile, was the daughter of Robert Carrington, 2nd Baron Carrington. Colville was educated at Marlborough College and entered the training ship  in July 1874. In October 1876 he was promoted midshipman and appointed to the battleship  in the Mediterranean Fleet. In May 1878 he transferred to the battleship  in the Channel Fleet and in January 1879 to the corvette  at the Cape of Good Hope Station. Later that year he served on land during the Anglo-Zulu War. In October 1880 he was commissioned sub-lieutenant and posted to Portsmouth for further training.

In July 1882 he joined the battleship , flagship of the Mediterranean Fleet. He was promoted lieutenant in November 1882 for his services at the bombardment of Alexandria. In May 1883 he joined the corvette  on the North American Station, serving alongside Midshipman Prince George of Wales (later King George V). In September 1884 he rejoined Alexandra and served ashore with the force attempting to relieve General Charles George Gordon at Khartoum. In October 1889 he joined the sloop  on the North America Station.

In August 1890 he was appointed First Lieutenant of the royal yacht Victoria and Albert. He was promoted commander in August 1892 and in May 1893 joined the battleship , now flagship of the Mediterranean Fleet. In 1896 he took command of the gunboats of the Nile Flotilla in Sudan. He was badly wounded, promoted captain in August 1896, and appointed Companion of the Order of the Bath (CB) in November 1896.

From 1897 to 1898 he was Naval Adviser to the Inspector-General of Fortifications at the War Office in London. In September 1898 he took command of the battleship  as Flag Captain to Rear-Admiral Penrose Fitzgerald, second-in-command of the China Station. On 1 March 1900 he was appointed Flag Captain to Vice-Admiral Sir Frederick Bedford in the cruiser  on the North America and West Indies Station. In May 1902 he became Chief of Staff to Admiral Sir Compton Domvile, commander-in-chief of the Mediterranean Fleet, in the battleship . He was appointed Commander of the Royal Victorian Order (CVO) when received in an audience by King Edward VII on 29 May 1902, and later the same year married the daughter of recently retired Admiral of the Fleet Lord Clanwilliam. In December 1905 he took command of the battleship  in the Atlantic Fleet and was appointed an Aide-de-camp to the King.

Colville was promoted rear-admiral in November 1906 and hoisted his flag in the Bulwark, now in the Home Fleet. In July 1909 he transferred his flag to the new battlecruiser . He was promoted vice-admiral in April 1911. In September 1914 he became Vice-Admiral Commanding, Orkneys and Shetlands and was shortly afterwards promoted admiral. He held this command until February 1916, when he was appointed Commander-in-Chief, Portsmouth. He was appointed Knight Grand Cross of the Royal Victorian Order (GCVO) in July 1915, and Knight Grand Cross of the Order of St Michael and St George (GCMG) in 1919. In July 1919 he was appointed First and Principal Naval Aide-de-Camp to the King, a post he held until his retirement in April 1922. He was appointed Knight Grand Cross of the Order of the Bath (GCB) in July 1921.

He was appointed to the honorary offices of Rear-Admiral of the United Kingdom in 1927 and Vice-Admiral of the United Kingdom and Lieutenant of the Admiralty in 1929.

Family
Colville married at St Peter's Church, Eaton Square on 6 December 1902 Lady Adelaide Jane Meade (1877 – 31 March 1960), a daughter of Richard Meade, 4th Earl of Clanwilliam. The marriage was attended by the Prince of Wales (later King George V) and a number of royal family members, and the couple received gifts from the King and Queen. They had four children, including Major-General Edward Charles Colville (1 September 1905 – 10 January 1982).

Footnotes

References
Biography, Oxford Dictionary of National Biography

External links

|-

|-

1861 births
1939 deaths
People from Belgravia
People educated at Marlborough College
Graduates of Britannia Royal Naval College
Royal Navy admirals
Royal Navy admirals of World War I
Royal Navy personnel of the Anglo-Egyptian War
Royal Navy personnel of the Mahdist War
Knights Grand Cross of the Order of the Bath
Knights Grand Cross of the Order of St Michael and St George
Knights Grand Cross of the Royal Victorian Order
Members of the British Royal Household
Younger sons of viscounts
Royal Navy personnel of the Anglo-Zulu War
People educated at Stubbington House School
Military personnel from London
Stanley